Chevy Chase Section Five is an incorporated village in Montgomery County, Maryland, United States.  The population was 672 at the 2020 census.

It is part of a larger community, colloquially referred to as Chevy Chase, that includes several adjoining settlements in Montgomery County and one neighborhood of Washington, D.C.

History
In 1922, the Maryland state legislature established the area as a special taxing district called Section Five of the Village of Chevy Chase. State law prohibited "riotous conduct, profanity, [and] vulgar language" within its bounds.

On May 18, 1982, a referendum was held on whether to incorporate as a village. The vote was in favor of incorporation.

Geography
Chevy Chase Section Five is located at  (38.983060, -77.074786).

Home prices in Chevy Chase Section Five range from just under $1,000,000 to well over $2,000,000.

Demographics

2010 census
As of the census of 2010, there were 658 people, 222 households, and 191 families living in the village. The racial makeup of the village was 95.6% White, 3.3% Hispanic or Latino of any race, 2.1% Asian, 1.8% from two or more races, 0.2% African American and 0.3% from other races.

There were 222 households, of which 45.9% had children under the age of 18 living with them, 78.4% were married couples living together, 4.1% had a female householder with no husband present, 3.6% had a male householder with no wife present, and 14.0% were non-families. 13.1% of all households were made up of individuals, and 8.6% had someone living alone who was 65 years of age or older. The average household size was 2.96 and the average family size was 3.24.

The median age in the village was 44 years. 31.2% of residents were under the age of 18; 4.3% were between the ages of 18 and 24; 17% were from 25 to 44; 34.6% were from 45 to 64; and 12.9% were 65 years of age or older. The gender makeup of the village was 46.7% male and 53.3% female.

2000 census
As of the census of 2000, there were 641 people, 224 households, and 189 families living in the village. The racial makeup of the village was 95.94% White, 0.16% African American, 1.25% Asian, 2.03% from other races, and 0.62% from two or more races. Hispanic or Latino of any race were 3.90% of the population.

There were 224 households, out of which 48.7% had children under the age of 18 living with them, 76.8% were married couples living together, 5.4% had a female householder with no husband present, and 15.6% were non-families. 13.4% of all households were made up of individuals, and 9.4% had someone living alone who was 65 years of age or older. The average household size was 2.86 and the average family size was 3.12.

In the village, the population was spread out, with 30.1% under the age of 18, 3.3% from 18 to 24, 21.8% from 25 to 44, 30.3% from 45 to 64, and 14.5% who were 65 years of age or older. The median age was 42 years. For every 100 females, there were 94.2 males. For every 100 females age 18 and over, there were 89.8 males.

The median income for a household in the village was $153,626, and the median income for a family was $168,664. Males had a median income of $100,000 versus $80,000 for females. The per capita income for the village was $70,372. None of the families and 0.5% of the population were living below the poverty line, including no under eighteens and none of those over 64.

Transportation

The only state highway serving Chevy Chase Section Five is Maryland Route 186 (Brookville Road). Maryland Route 185 (Connecticut Avenue) passes just west of the village.

Education
Residents are served by schools in the Montgomery County Public Schools.

Residents are zoned to Rosemary Hills Elementary School (PreK-2), Chevy Chase Elementary School (3-6), Silver Creek Middle School, and Bethesda-Chevy Chase High School.

References

External links

 

1922 establishments in Maryland
1982 establishments in Maryland
Chevy Chase, Maryland
Populated places established in 1922
Populated places established in 1982
Suburbs of Washington, D.C.
Upper class culture in Maryland
Villages in Montgomery County, Maryland